Bárbara Hechavarría (born 6 August 1966) is a retired female discus thrower from Cuba. Her personal best throw is 68.18 metres, achieved in February 1989 in Havana.

Achievements

References

1966 births
Living people
Cuban female discus throwers
Athletes (track and field) at the 1991 Pan American Games
Athletes (track and field) at the 1995 Pan American Games
Athletes (track and field) at the 1992 Summer Olympics
Athletes (track and field) at the 1996 Summer Olympics
Olympic athletes of Cuba
Pan American Games medalists in athletics (track and field)
Pan American Games gold medalists for Cuba
Goodwill Games medalists in athletics
Central American and Caribbean Games gold medalists for Cuba
Competitors at the 1990 Central American and Caribbean Games
Competitors at the 1993 Central American and Caribbean Games
Competitors at the 1998 Central American and Caribbean Games
Central American and Caribbean Games medalists in athletics
Competitors at the 1989 Summer Universiade
Competitors at the 1993 Summer Universiade
Competitors at the 1994 Goodwill Games
Competitors at the 1998 Goodwill Games
Medalists at the 1991 Pan American Games
Medalists at the 1995 Pan American Games
20th-century Cuban women